Schnitzelburg is a neighborhood three miles southeast of downtown Louisville, Kentucky. Schnitzelburg's boundaries are Clarks Lane to the south, Shelby Street to the west, CSX railroad tracks to the north, and Goss Avenue to the east.

History 

The area was first plotted in 1866 by D.H. Meriwether and known as Meriwether's Enlargement, but actual construction didn't begin until 1891 when a streetcar line extended to the intersection of Goss and Texas Avenues. The first residents in Schnitzelburg were immigrants who arrived there from Germany. "Schnitzel" refers to a food dish, popular with Austrians and Germans.

Culture
Schnitzelburg is famous for a street ball game called "Dainty," where a flat, bat-like stick is used to strike another stick on the ground, making it airborne, which is then hit like a baseball as far as possible. Every last Monday in July the World Dainty Championship is held in the neighborhood, at the corner of Goss Avenue and Hoertz Avenue, site of Hauck's Handy Store. The Dainty is a fund raiser for the Little Sisters of the Poor, and it brings the community together for some great fun. Contestants must be 45 and older to play the Dainty.

Check's Cafe is located at the intersection of Hickory and Burnett Streets and is among Louisville's better known restaurants. Manual Stadium is located in Schnitzelburg.
Schnitzelburg is known for its number of "Shotgun-Style" homes in which the homes are built narrowly with rooms being situated generally one after the other in a long row.

Demographics
As of 2000, the population of Schnitzelburg was 4,420.  92.7 percent of the residents were white, and 5.1 percent were black. Hispanics made up 1.7 of the population, and 3.2 percent were listed as "other." 22.8 percent of that population were college graduates, while 20.7 percent of the population did not have a high school degree. Females outnumber males 51.1 to 48.9 percent.

See also
German American
History of the Germans in Louisville

References

External links
   Images of Schnitzelburg (Louisville, Ky.) in the University of Louisville Libraries Digital Collections

German-American culture in Louisville, Kentucky
Neighborhoods in Louisville, Kentucky
Populated places established in 1866
1866 establishments in Kentucky